Tessmanniacanthus is a Monotypic genus] of flowering plants belonging to the family Acanthaceae. It only contains one known species, Tessmanniacanthus chlamydocardioides 

It is native to Peru.

The genus name of Tessmanniacanthus is partly in honour of Günther Tessmann (1884–1969), a German-Brazilian ethnologist and botanist. He was also an African explorer and plant collector, who later settled in Brazil. The second part of the name refers to Acanthus.
The Latin specific epithet of chlamydocardioides refers to the resemblance of its inflorescence bracts to those of ''Chlamydocardia buettneri.

Both the species and the genus were first described and published in Notizbl. Bot. Gart. Berlin-Dahlem Vol.9 on page 987 in 1926.

References

Acanthaceae
Acanthaceae genera
Plants described in 1845
Flora of Peru
Taxa named by Johannes Mildbraed